Ronald Logan (February 9, 1938 – August 30, 2022) was an American businessman who served as executive vice president of Walt Disney Entertainment (now Walt Disney Creative Entertainment). After retiring from the company in 2001, he was formally a professor at the University of Central Florida Rosen College of Hospitality Management in Orlando, Florida, United States.

Life and career

Growing up in Leavenworth, Kansas, Logan studied trumpet, violin, piano, and dance. He began performing professionally in the ninth grade and has performed as a trumpet player and singer on recordings, television, motion pictures, and with bands and lounge acts throughout the United States. He began his career with Disney in the 1960s as a trumpet player at Disneyland Park in Anaheim, California.

As executive vice president of Walt Disney Entertainment, Logan was responsible for creating, casting, and producing all live entertainment products for The Walt Disney Company, including the Disneyland Resort, the Walt Disney World Resort, Tokyo Disney Resort, Disneyland Resort Paris, The Disney Institute, Disney Business Productions, Disney Cruise Line, Disney Entertainment Productions, and Walt Disney Entertainment Worldwide.

Logan also was executive vice president of the Walt Disney Special Events Group, executive vice president of Disney Special Programs, Incorporated and the founder and first president of Disney Theatrical Productions, which produced Beauty and the Beast on Broadway and later, around the world.

He authored Walt Disney Entertainment - A Retrospective Look, an internal publication that documents the evolution of Walt Disney Entertainment from 1955 through 2000.

Logan retired from Disney in 2001 and later was an associate professor at the Rosen College of Hospitality Management at the University of Central Florida and the university's vice president of special events.

He died on August 30, 2022, at the age of 84.

Education and achievements
Logan held BA and MA degrees in music and music education from UCLA. He was a founding member of the International Foundation for Jazz institution of classical music, a corporate advisory council established in support of the International Association of Jazz Educators. He was a board member of the Orlando Repertory Theatre, served on the Board of Directors for the Famous People Players (Canada) and the International Theatre in Long Beach, California.

In 2007, Logan was honored with the Disney Legends Award, which is presented to individuals who have made a significant impact on The Walt Disney Company.

Works
During Logan's tenure, Walt Disney Entertainment's productions included:

Disneyland Resort
 Fantasmic! - Disneyland Park
 The Lion King Parade - Disneyland Park

Walt Disney World Resort
 Grand Opening Ceremonies - Epcot, Disney-MGM Studios (now Disney's Hollywood Studios) and Disney's Animal Kingdom
 Legend of the Lion King - Magic Kingdom
 SpectroMagic - Magic Kingdom
 Skyleidoscope - Epcot
 Laserphonic Fantasy - Epcot
 Surprise in the Skies - Epcot
 IllumiNations: Reflections of Earth - Epcot
 Tapestry of Nations - Epcot
 Sorcery in the Sky - Disney-MGM Studios
 The Hunchback of Notre Dame - A Musical Adventure - Disney-MGM Studios
 Aladdin's Royal Caravan - Disney-MGM Studios
 Beauty and the Beast Live on Stage! - Disney's Hollywood Studios
 Voyage of the Little Mermaid - Disney's Hollywood Studios
 Fantasmic! - Disney's Hollywood Studios
 Lights, Motors, Action! Extreme Stunt Show - Disney's Hollywood Studios
 Festival of the Lion King - Disney's Animal Kingdom

Tokyo Disney Resort
 Disney Carnivale - Tokyo Disneyland
 Tokyo Disneyland Electrical Parade - Tokyo Disneyland
 Disney's Fantillusion - Tokyo Disneyland

Disneyland Paris
 Buffalo Bill's Wild West Dinner Show - Disney Village
 Disney ImagiNations Parade - Disneyland Park
 Moteurs... Action! Stunt Show Spectacular - Walt Disney Studios Park

Hong Kong Disneyland Resort
 Festival of the Lion King - Hong Kong Disneyland

Other venues
 Beauty and the Beast - Broadway in New York
 Tapestry of Nations Super Bowl XXXIV Halftime Show - Georgia Dome in Georgia
 Indiana Jones and the Temple of the Forbidden Eye Super Bowl XXIX Halftime Show - Joe Robbie Stadium in Miami
 1987 Pan American Games - Indianapolis Speedway in Indiana
 DisneyFest - Asia

References

1938 births
2022 deaths
Walt Disney Parks and Resorts people
Disney executives
People from Leavenworth, Kansas
UCLA School of the Arts and Architecture alumni
University of Central Florida faculty
UCLA Graduate School of Education and Information Studies alumni